John Lewis Radovonich (born 10 January 1965) is a former field hockey player from New Zealand, who finished in eighth position with the men's national team, nicknamed Black Sticks, at the 1992 Summer Olympics in Barcelona, Spain. He was born in Christchurch.

References
 New Zealand Olympic Committee

External links
 

New Zealand male field hockey players
New Zealand people of Croatian descent
Field hockey players at the 1992 Summer Olympics
1998 Men's Hockey World Cup players
Olympic field hockey players of New Zealand
Field hockey players from Christchurch
1965 births
Living people